Malpertuis (released in the US as The Legend of Doom House) is a 1971 Belgian fantasy horror film directed by Harry Kümel, based on the 1943 novel of the same name. It was selected for the official selection and was presented "in competition" at the 1972 Cannes Film Festival. A Flemish "director's cut" version was released in 1973.

Plot
Jan (Mathieu Carrière), a young sailor, returns to land, and while searching for his childhood home, is mysteriously abducted. He awakens in an isolated old mansion called Malpertuis, where he find himself among various relatives, including his sister Nancy (Susan Hampshire), as well as a strange taxidermist and a resident madman called Lampernisse (Jean-Pierre Cassel). The mansion turns out to be a labyrinth of corridors, staircases, and secret chambers, belonging to his family.

His bedridden occultist uncle Cassavius (Orson Welles) is about to divide the estate to his heirs, but, as it turns out, only if they commit themselves never to leave the premises. They find themselves trapped in a mystery where they enact gods from Greek mythology, which Cassavius believes them to be, while anyone who tries to escape is found horribly murdered. The plot remains obscure to the end, as Jan tries to unravel the mystery and seems to spiral into a dreamlike madness.

Cast
 Orson Welles as Cassavius
 Susan Hampshire as Nancy / Euryale / Alice (Alecto) / Nurse / Charlotte
 Michel Bouquet as Dideloo
 Mathieu Carrière as Jan
 Jean-Pierre Cassel as Lampernisse
 Daniel Pilon as Mathias Crook
 Walter Rilla as Eisengott
 Dora van der Groen as Sylvie Dideloo
 Charles Janssens as Philarette
 Sylvie Vartan as Bets

Versions
The English language version of the film that premiered at the 1972 Cannes Film Festival was 100 minutes, as it had been edited by the American distributor from the original 1971 version, and retitled The Legend of Doom House. It was subsequently edited further by other distributors. The Royal Belgian Film Archive, together with director Harry Kümel, worked to restore the uncut Flemish version of the film, which was released in 1973 as "the director's cut". This version is 20 minutes longer, containing some of the best scenes of the film, which had been edited out. Although this version is more complete, the original voice of Orson Welles is missing from it.

Reception

Neil Smith of the BBC gave the film 2/5 stars, calling it "Bizarre, lurid and baffling". Michael Barrett from PopMatters rated it 7/10 stars, calling it "ragged and dizzy, full of sharp zooms and frantic cuts." On his website Fantastic Movie Musings and Ramblings, Dave Sindelar called it "[a] disorienting, slightly disturbing and sometimes infuriating movie"

See also
 Orson Welles filmography

References

External links
 
 
 
 

1971 films
1971 horror films
1970s avant-garde and experimental films
1970s fantasy films
West German films
Belgian avant-garde and experimental films
Belgian horror films
Belgian fantasy films
1970s Dutch-language films
English-language Belgian films
English-language French films
English-language German films
1970s French-language films
Films scored by Georges Delerue
Films directed by Harry Kümel
Films based on Belgian novels
Films based on classical mythology
Films based on horror novels
Films set in country houses
French supernatural horror films
Surrealist films
1970s supernatural horror films
Films shot in Bruges
Films shot in Belgium
1971 multilingual films
Belgian multilingual films
French multilingual films
German multilingual films
1970s French films